This page presents some of the notable achievements of Sachin Tendulkar, a former Indian cricketer, universally regarded as one of the best batsmen of all time. Debates on Tendulkar's precise rank amongst his predecessors are unlikely to conclude soon. He was the sport's first batsman to score a double century (200 runs not out) in a single One Day International match, and is so far the only player to have scored 100 centuries in internationals. He played first-class cricket for 26 years and one day, whilst his international career spanned exactly 24 years from 15 November 1989 to 16 November 2013.

Awards

Career and annual awards 
 1994: Arjuna Award recipient for achievements in cricket
 1997: Tendulkar was one of the five cricketers selected as Wisden Cricketer of the Year.
 1997/98: India's highest sporting honour – Rajiv Gandhi Khel Ratna
 1999: Padma Shri – India's fourth highest civilian award
 2001: Maharashtra Bhushan Award – Maharashtra's highest civilian award
 2008: Padma Vibhushan – India's second-highest civilian award
 2010: ICC Cricketer of the year – Highest award in the ICC listings
 2010: LG People's Choice Award
 ICC World Test XI: 2009, 2010, 2011
 ICC World ODI XI: 2004, 2007, 2010
 Wisden Leading Cricketer in the World 1998, 2010
 2014: Bharat Ratna – India's highest civilian award
Most Effective Swachhata Ambassador award at Safaigiri – 2019
 2020: Laureus World Sports Awards – Sporting Moment of the Year (2000–2020)

Awards from the media 
 In August 2003, he was voted as the "Greatest Sportsman" of the country in the sport personalities category in the Best of India poll conducted by Zee News.
 In November 2006, Time magazine named him as one of the Asian Heroes.
 In December 2006, he was named "Sports Person of the Year"
 In June 2009, Time magazine included his test debut in "Top 10 Sporting Moments".
 In 2010, he was voted as one of the world's 100 most influential people in "The 2010 Time 100" poll conducted by Time magazine.
 The India Poised campaign run by The Times of India nominated him as the "Face of New India" next to the likes of Amartya Sen and Mahatma Gandhi.
 In February 2010, he was declared "Sports Icon of the Year for 21 years" at the NDTV Indian of the Year Awards.

Awards for individual matches and series 
Tendulkar has won a record 15 Man of the Series (MoS) and 62 Man of the Match (MoM) awards in ODI Matches. He has won a Man of the Match Award against every one of the ICC Full Members (Test Playing Nations). The only teams against whom he has not won an ODI Man of the Match award, are the United Arab Emirates (2 matches played), the Netherlands (1 match) and Bermuda (1 match).

Man of the Match awards

Man of the Series awards

Total Man of the Match awards by opposition

See also 
 List of international cricket centuries by Sachin Tendulkar
 List of cricketers by number of international centuries scored
 Player of the Match awards (cricket)
 List of One Day International cricket records
 List of Test cricket records

References

External links 
 Sachin Tendulkar @cricinfo
 Sachin Tendulkar's Five Best Test Centuries

Sachin Tendulkar
Indian cricket lists
Career achievements of cricketers